Fahad-ul-Haq (born 16 December 1982) is a Pakistani cricketer who plays for Lahore cricket team. He made his first-class debut in 2002–03, and played in 73 first-class matches during his career.

References

External links
 

1982 births
Living people
Pakistani cricketers
Lahore cricketers
Cricketers from Lahore